The 2008 NCAA Division II women's basketball tournament was the 27th annual tournament hosted by the NCAA to determine the national champion of Division II women's  collegiate basketball in the United States.

Northern Kentucky defeated South Dakota in the championship game, 63–58, to claim the Norse's second NCAA Division II national title and first since 2000.

As in 2008, the championship rounds were contested at the Health and Sports Center on the campus of the University of Nebraska at Kearney in Kearney, Nebraska.

Regionals

East - Indiana, Pennsylvania
Location: Memorial Field House Host: Indiana University of Pennsylvania

Great Lakes - Springfield, Missouri
Location: Weiser Gymnasium Host: Drury University

North Central - Vermillion, South Dakota
Location: DakotaDome Host: University of South Dakota

Northeast - Philadelphia, Pennsylvania
Location: Campus Center Gymnasium Host: Holy Family University

South - Cleveland, Mississippi
Location: Walter Sillers Coliseum Host: Delta State University

South Atlantic - Florence, South Carolina
Location: Smith University Center Host: Francis Marion University

South Central - Canyon, Texas
Location: First United Bank Center Host: West Texas A&M University

West - Seattle, Washington
Location: Royal Brougham Pavilion Host: Seattle Pacific University

Elite Eight - Kearney, Nebraska
Location: Cushing Coliseum Host: University of Nebraska at Kearney

All-tournament team
 Angela Healy, Northern Kentucky
 Cassie Brannen, Northern Kentucky
 Jeana Hoffman, South Dakota
 Bridget Yoerger, South Dakota
 Johannah Leedham, Franklin Pierce

See also
 2008 NCAA Division I women's basketball tournament
 2008 NCAA Division III women's basketball tournament
 2008 NAIA Division I women's basketball tournament
 2008 NAIA Division II women's basketball tournament
 2008 NCAA Division II men's basketball tournament

References
 2008 NCAA Division II women's basketball tournament jonfmorse.com

 
NCAA Division II women's basketball tournament
2008 in Nebraska